The Little Emperors is a 1951 historical novel by the English author Alfred Duggan. The novel follows the speculative exploits of Caius Felix in the Roman-British province of Britannia Prima.

Plot synopsis
The story is set in Britain in 405–411 CE, telling of the decline of the Roman government in the diocese of Britannia.

Caius Sempronius Felix is a career Imperial civil servant. Born in the port city of Tingis in the Roman province of Mauritania Tingitana, he has served in many major Roman centres and has, by dint of loyalty and hard work (and not a little absconding with treasury funds), been appointed praeses (provincial governor) of Britannia Prima. Based in Londinium, and nominally responsible to the vicarius of the diocese, he is effectively the ruler – treasurer, administrator and magistrate with wide powers. He is married for political reasons to Maria, a younger woman and nominal Christian. His father-in-law Gratianus is a rich and scheming financier.

Felix tries hard to maintain what he sees as the high standards of Roman administration and etiquette that he has learned in centres in continental Europe closer to Rome. He is ruthless in punishing suspected criminals and seeing that taxes are paid on time; he does not hesitate to engage in various casual cruelties with his slaves, and his judicial decisions are often arbitrary. But all about him, the civilisation he single-mindedly supports is slowly breaking down. He tries hard to balance his limited budget, despite a moribund economy and constant demands for extra military spending. Rome still wins some military victories, but then the Germans invade Gaul and Britain is cut off.

With ever more depressing news of other provinces breaking away from the Empire, military defeats and the threat of Saxon pirate activity on the coast, Felix finds himself drawn into a military coup. Gratianus conspires to declare Britannia independent of the remaining Roman Empire and elevates one Marcus, an army officer from Eburacum, to become Emperor of Britannia.

Despite his military skills, the Sacred Marcus, as he has now become, proves to be only semi-literate and a crude character. He quickly invites Maria to become his mistress, planning to remove Felix. Gratianus and Maria have Marcus assassinated. Felix thinks Britannia will now revert to supporting the legitimate emperor Honorius; but instead Gratianus has himself proclaimed Emperor. Felix is left completely dependent on them and aware that if Gratianus is overthrown he (as the emperor's son-in-law) will be put to death by any successor regime.

Gratianus and Maria become suspicious that the military commander, Constantine (the historical usurper Constantine III), may wish to make himself emperor and found a dynasty with his son Constans. They decide to pre-empt this by assassinating Constans; Maria will invite him to dinner, kill him, and accuse him of trying to rape her. Felix is aware of the plot and travels to Verulamium to give himself an alibi. Here, he is confronted by Paulinus, his confidential clerk, a freedman and one of the few educated men in Londinium he can talk to as an intellectual equal. The clerk reveals himself as the chief of the agentes in rebus (Imperial secret service) sworn to be loyal to the reigning emperor. He reveals that Constantine and Constans suspected Gratianus and Maria and pre-empted the plot by having them killed; Constantine will now declare himself emperor. He is required to arrest and interrogate Felix, but during the interregnum, he is technically masterless and he sympathetically gives Felix the opportunity to flee.

Felix travels westwards through a country he has never seen and knows little about, only now does he realise how far the province has deteriorated. He has no survival skills and cannot communicate with the scattered peasants who speak only Celtic. But after many months, he meets a Celtic soldier who takes him to the court of his brother, the client-king of the province of Britannia Secunda. The king gives Felix sanctuary in return for writing a history of his family and himself for posterity. Felix eventually dies of grief and despair after hearing of the sack of Rome by Alaric. Meanwhile, Constantine and Constans have taken the remaining Roman troops from Britain to mount an unsuccessful attempt to seize control of the whole Western Empire. They are killed and their troops annihilated, and the Romano-British population are left to fend for themselves under client-kings such as the one served by Felix.

Duggan emphasises the bureaucratic and authoritarian nature of the late Roman Imperial administration. (Felix constantly laments that the administration can only be supported by high taxes, which the population are unable to pay, after which taxes are raised still further to make up for the deficit; the characters take it for granted that society can only work if people are bound to their trades, and express bewilderment that earlier classical texts seem to assume that people can choose their own occupations.) This may be a satirical aside aimed at the welfare and planning legislation of the 1945–51 Labour government of Clement Attlee.

Relation to other works
The novel can be seen as existing in counterpoint with Conscience of the King. Felix is an upholder of Roman civilisation who sees its collapse from within and realises that many of the beneficial characteristics he attributed to the empire are delusory. Cerdic in Conscience of the King deserts Romano-British civilisation for its barbarian enemies, but even as he helps to destroy the remnants of civilisation he remains aware that something valuable is being lost.

Historical background

The book contains a Historical Note, in which the author sets out what is documented history (not very much) and what he made up to fill in the gaps. As an example, a usurper called Marcus existed, but nothing is known of him.

At this time of the novel, Roman Britain was a diocese divided into five provinces, of which the most important was centred on London (Londinium). Duggan names this province Britannia Prima. Other historians have argued that Britannia Prima was elsewhere and the London province was called Maxima Caesariensis.

It is implied that the client-king of Britannia Secunda may be an ancestor of King Arthur.

There is also a reference to Vortigern, though without any details.

References 

1951 British novels
Modern Arthurian fiction
Novels set in sub-Roman Britain
Novels by Alfred Duggan
Faber and Faber books